The Monastery of the Holy Trinity, also known as Rusinica (Русиница) was a medieval Serbian Orthodox monastery and a designated cultural monument located near Mušutište, Kosovo. It was completely demolished in July 1999 by Kosovo-Albanian militants.

History 
It was founded in the 14th century on the Rusinica hill above Mušutište, in the District of Branković, part of Medieval Serbia. The monastery’s existence in written records was first dated to 1465. It was well known for its valuable collection of manuscripts dating from the 14th to the 18th century. Particularly noted were a 'Book of Commemoration' from 1465 and a hand-written Gospel from the 14th century. The monastery also treasured a collection of wooden icons from the 1800s.

In June 1999, the Monastery of Holy Trinity in Mušutište was looted by Albanian militants and in July of the same year it was completely blown up. The fire after the explosion destroyed all the buildings in the church courtyard, along with the nearby Church of the Holy Theotokos Hodigetria and the ancient manuscripts.

Notes

References 

Medieval Serbian Orthodox monasteries
Serbian Orthodox monasteries in Kosovo
Christian monasteries established in the 14th century
Persecution of Serbs
Destroyed churches in Kosovo
Protected Monuments of Culture